SLNS Sayurala (P623) (Sayurala meaning: Sea waves) was an Offshore Patrol Vessel (OPV) of the Sri Lanka Navy. It was named as the CGS Vigraha (39), a Vikram-class offshore patrol craft of the Indian Coast Guard. She was in service in Sri Lanka from 2009 during the Sri Lankan Civil War, before being returned to India in 2011.

Operations
Sayurala was tasked with deep sea patrolling both within the Sri Lankan territorial waters and in international waters to curb possible arms smuggling during the Sri Lankan Civil War. She was returned to the Indian Coast Guard in 2008.

CGS Vigraha
Commissioned on 12 April 1990, CGS Vigraha (39) served with the Indian Coast Guard until she was transferred to the Sri Lanka Navy.

References

External links
 www.bharat-rakshak.com
 SNS Sayurala becomes the newest Commissioned Ship in the SLN Fleet

Ships of the Sri Lanka Navy
Naval ships of Sri Lanka
1990 ships

pl:SLNS Sagara